"Chopstix" (stylized as "CHopstix") is a song by American rappers Schoolboy Q and Travis Scott, released on April 8, 2019 by Top Dawg Entertainment and Interscope Records. It is the second single from Schoolboy Q's fifth studio album Crash Talk (2019). The song was produced by DJ Dahi. The song received mixed to negative reviews.

Background 
On September 29, 2018, the song was leaked as part of a larger unauthorized release of TDE material. It had different verses and a guest appearance from Kendrick Lamar, but the feature was replaced by Travis Scott. On March 20, 2019, Schoolboy debuted the song live on The Tonight Show Starring Jimmy Fallon. The song was set to release on April 4, 2019, but it was postponed to April 8 due to the death of Nipsey Hussle. However, it was accidentally uploaded onto Spotify on April 4 but was immediately taken down.

Composition 
In the song, the rappers compare a woman's legs to chopsticks, with the utensils being an abstract imagery for sex. Schoolboy Q raps about a romantic encounter, "flexes and salutes the 'five-star' chicks on the melodic track". Travis Scott sings the hook with melodic vocals in Auto-Tune. The song's chorus was written by Kendrick Lamar.

Charts

References 

2019 singles
2019 songs
Schoolboy Q songs
Songs written by Schoolboy Q
Travis Scott songs
Songs written by Travis Scott
Songs written by DJ Dahi
Songs written by Kendrick Lamar
Top Dawg Entertainment singles
Interscope Records singles
Universal Music Group singles
Song recordings produced by DJ Dahi
Music videos directed by Nabil Elderkin